( or ) is a type of traditional snow dome or quinzhee in snowy regions of Japan.  may also refer to the various ceremonial winter celebrations involving those snow domes, or to the Shinto deity , who is revered during some of those celebrations. During some  festivals, altars are set up inside domes of snow and Shinto rites are performed. 

The ceremonies in some locales are reputedly adaptations of a traditional ceremony once held in the Kyoto Imperial Palace. It appears that the practice of worshipping , a Shinto god of water, during the winter came to northeastern Japan during the early Kamakura period when 
the Nikaidō clan became local landowners. This ceremony may have morphed into various winter fire festivals during which villagers pray for good harvests. In the Uonuma region of south-central Niigata Prefecture, 

One theory holds that the term  arose from the resemblance of many snow domes to round ceramic kilns. In either case, the connection with the city of Kamakura in present-day Kanagawa prefecture is tenuous. However, in places where the deity  is worshipped and Kamakura festivals date back to the days of the  Kamakura shogunate, the ceremony might have been one way for the shogunate to ritually display its power.

Specific  celebrations

Yokote  Festival 

Winter events with  snow huts are currently held in a number of locations in Japan.
For example, in Yokote City in central Akita prefecture such events are celebrated every February 14 to 16. 
This event likely dates to a time when the Onodera clan ruled that area during the Sengoku period. 
During Yokote's  Festival, several hundred snow domes of various sizes dot the city. 
This event is immediately followed by a  Festival during which Shinto ceremonies occur. 
Together, both festivals are sometimes jointly described as the "Yokote Snow Festival". In Yokote City there is also a small museum about the history of kamakura snow domes.

Rokugō  Festival 
Not far north from Yokote City in the Semboku District of Akita prefecture another  festival is held each February 11 to 15. 
The "Rokugō Kamakura Festival" has been classified as an Intangible Folk Cultural Asset by the Japanese Agency for Cultural Affairs.
During that festival, numerous  ice houses can be seen. However, photographs reveal that not all of these have a rounded shapes:  some have square walls and thatched bamboo roofs. "bird chasing huts"). Moreover, the Shinto deity "Kamakura Daimyojin" is enshrined in some of those ceremonial winter huts. 
On each February 13 in Rokugō village, children typically visit each other's huts and sing songs about chasing birds. 
Two days later, there is usually a rice-cake pounding ceremony to celebrate the end of winter.
During that time, willow cocoon balls are made to decorate altars of the deity Kamakura Daimyojin.
Those cocoon balls are fashioned from rice cakes attached to willow twigs. Other traditional ceremonies are held during this festival such as bamboo pole battles between opposing teams as well as "bonfire battles" featuring blazing long bamboo poles.

Narayama  Festival  

Much smaller in scale than the previous two festivals, the Narayama Kamakura Festival is held every February 12–15
in Narayama Otamachi, an area that is now part of central Akita City. Originally this festival was held during the first 
full moon of the ancient lunar calendar, but now it falls regularly on the same date of the solar Gregorian calendar.
A makeshift Shinto shrine of snow with bamboo and straw roofing is erected for this festival each year and both 
At one time only males were allowed inside the shrine, 
but now those gender restrictions have been lifted. Empty rice bales are stacked inside the shrine of snow. 
Towards the end of the festival, one of those bales is lit during a special ceremony.
Because a fire broke out during this festival in 1910, the ceremony was banned for sixty years.
However, in 1975 the local neighborhood association revived this event, which now attracts many local residents and even some visitors from afar.

Other locations  

Hirosaki Castle in Aomori Prefecture, and a number of other places in Japan with cold winters.

References

Japanese culture
Winter festivals in Japan
Buildings and structures made of snow or ice